Pinchinthorpe is a small hamlet near Guisborough in Redcar and Cleveland, England.  It is a linear settlement spread along the A173. The postcode is TS14 8HE.

Until 1951, Pinchinthorpe had a working railway station, on the line from Middlesbrough to Guisborough.  The village has four bus stops, two of which are not near any housing.

Pinchinthorpe is the starting point for the Guisborough Forest Walkway.

Pinchinthorpe Hall was the home of a microbrewery; "The North Yorkshire Brewery" and bottling plant for mineral water.

There is a spring supply for mains water from the nearby hills, meaning that there is no water rate payable by the residents.

See also
 Spring supply

References

External links

Villages in North Yorkshire
Places in the Tees Valley
Guisborough